The 2015–16 Louisiana–Monroe Warhawks men's basketball team represented the University of Louisiana at Monroe in the 2015–16 NCAA Division I men's basketball season. The Warhawks were led by sixth year head coach Keith Richard, played their home games at Fant–Ewing Coliseum and were members of the Sun Belt Conference. They finished the season 20–14, 15–5 in Sun Belt play to finish in second place. They defeated Texas–Arlington in the semifinals of the Sun Belt tournament to advance to the championship game where they lost to Little Rock. They were invited to the CollegeInsider.com Tournament where they lost in the first round to Furman.

Roster

Schedule

|-
!colspan=9 style="background:#8C1919; color:#FFCC33;"| Exhibition

|-
!colspan=9 style="background:#8C1919; color:#FFCC33;"| Regular season

|-
!colspan=9 style="background:#8C1919; color:#FFCC33;"| Sun Belt tournament

|-
!colspan=9 style="background:#8C1919; color:#FFCC33;"| CIT

References

Louisiana–Monroe Warhawks men's basketball seasons
Louisiana-Monroe
Louisiana-Monroe